The 14th Biathlon European Championships were held in Bansko, Bulgaria from February 21 to February 25, 2007.

There were total of 16 competitions held: sprint, pursuit, individual and relay both for U26 and U21.

Schedule of events 

The schedule of the event stands below. All times in CET.

Results

U26

Men's

Women's

U21

Men's

Women's

Medal table

External links 
 IBU full results

 
Biathlon European Championships
International sports competitions hosted by Bulgaria
2007 in biathlon
2007 in Bulgarian sport